Reuben James ( 1776 – 3 December 1838) was a boatswain's mate of the United States Navy, famous for an act of heroism in the First Barbary War. As of current knowledge, that act was likely conducted by fellow sailor Daniel Frazier and later attributed to James due to a misunderstanding.

Career

Born in Delaware around 1776, James joined the United States Navy and served on several ships, including the frigate . During the First Barbary War, the American frigate  was captured by the Barbary pirates when she ran aground in the city of Tripoli, on the southern shores of the Mediterranean Sea.  During the course of the naval blockade of the harbor, there were numerous engagements, the most intense being the Gunboat Battle of August 3, 1804. During the battle,  Lieutenant Stephen Decatur boarded a Tripolitan gunboat that he believed was crewed by the men who had mortally wounded his brother after supposedly surrendering. While Lieutenant Decatur was locked in hand-to-hand combat with the Tripolitan commander, another Tripolitan sailor swung his saber at him.  According to early accepted accounts, Reuben James interposed himself between the descending sword and his commander, taking the blow on his head.  The blow did not kill him, and he recovered later to continue serving in the Navy.

This account, though, is now considered to be in error.  No one by the name of James is recorded as having received medical treatment after the battle. Another of Decatur's crewmen, Daniel Frazier, did receive medical treatment for a serious saber slash to the head.  This supports some initial accounts that it was Frazier, not James, who saved Decatur's life.

James continued his Naval career, serving many years with Decatur. He was forced to retire in January 1836 because of ill health. He died in 1838 at the U.S. Naval Hospital in Washington, DC.

Influence
Three warships of the Navy have been named Reuben James in his honor:
  [1919-1941], a four-stack , sunk by a German submarine 31 October 1941, after Germany had invaded Poland but before the US had entered World War II.  Commemorated in the song "The Sinking of the Reuben James."
 , [1942-1971], a 
This ship is mentioned in the 1990 classic motion picture The Hunt for Red October (film), and it participated in the filming, though it is not the ship actually shown.

James Island of Washington state was named for James.

References

Other sources
Wheelan, Joseph.  Jefferson's War:  American's First War on Terror  1801--1805, New York:  Carroll & Graf Publishers, 2003.

External links
 United States Naval Institute: Lest We Forget
 

1776 births
1838 deaths
American military personnel of the First Barbary War
United States Navy sailors
American military personnel of the Second Barbary War